Earl Amasa Jones (born January 13, 1961) is an American former professional basketball player. He was a member of the Los Angeles Lakers and Milwaukee Bucks.

Early years
Jones attended Mount Hope High School for three seasons, where he led the school to 63 wins in 72 games and the 1978 West Virginia Class AA championship game, while he averaged 28 points. But he struggled outside of the basketball court and at one point as a junior, missed 63 consecutive days of school. 

As a senior, he was convinced by William Robinson (who had become his legal guardian), to transfer to Spingarn High School, where he had to go through a legal process over his eligibility. 

He averaged 20 points and 15 rebounds per game, while leading the team to a city championship. He was considered an elite basketball prospect and one of the best players in the nation, but his low grades (2.1 grade average) limited the offers he received from NCAA Division I schools.

College career
Jones enrolled at Division II University of the District of Columbia, where Robinson was named an assistant coach. As a sophomore in 1982, he led the school to the National Collegiate Athletic Associate Division II Championship. 

He was a three-time Division II All-American and a two-time NCAA Division II Player of the Year, with a career scoring average of 21.7 points. He represented the United States in the World Games.

Professional career
Entering the 1984 NBA draft, he was considered a risk, because of his small school experience, his underdeveloped body and his reputation as an underachiever. He was selected by the Los Angeles Lakers with the 23rd pick in the 1st round of the 1984 NBA draft.

As a rookie, he was limited by injuries, including a fractured right foot. He appeared in only two games for a total of seven minutes and took only one shot. On October 9, 1985, he was traded to the San Antonio Spurs in exchange for "future considerations". On October 22, he was waived.

In 1985, he played for the Kansas City Sizzlers of the Continental Basketball Association. On January 13, 1986, he signed a 10-day contract with the Milwaukee Bucks. On January 23, he signed a second 10-day contract. 

In 1995, he signed with the Rockford Lightning of the Continental Basketball Association.

References

External links
 NBA stats @ basketballreference.com

1961 births
Living people
American expatriate basketball people in Italy
American expatriate basketball people in Spain
American men's basketball players
Basketball players from West Virginia
Centers (basketball)
Joventut Badalona players
Kansas City Sizzlers players
Liga ACB players
Los Angeles Lakers draft picks
Los Angeles Lakers players
McDonald's High School All-Americans
Milwaukee Bucks players
Olympique Antibes basketball players
Pallacanestro Trieste players
Parade High School All-Americans (boys' basketball)
People from Oak Hill, West Virginia
Rockford Lightning players
UDC Firebirds men's basketball players
United States men's national basketball team players
1982 FIBA World Championship players